The Tepui elaenia (Elaenia olivina) is a species of bird in the family Tyrannidae.

Distribution and habitat
It is found in Guyana and Venezuela. It is sometimes considered a subspecies of the Sierran elaenia. Its natural habitats are subtropical or tropical moist montane forests and heavily degraded former forest.

References

Tepui elaenia
Birds of the Tepuis
Tepui elaenia